The Butcherpen Mound (8SR29) is a prehistoric archaeological site associated with the Weeden Island culture, located near Gulf Breeze, in the U.S. state of Florida. Carbon dating at the site has dated it to roughly 1005 CE. On September 28, 1998, it was added to the U.S. National Register of Historic Places.

References

External links
 Santa Rosa County listings at National Register of Historic Places

Weeden Island culture
Archaeological sites in Florida
National Register of Historic Places in Santa Rosa County, Florida
Mounds in Florida